The canton of Glarus is a canton in east central Switzerland. The capital is Glarus.
The population speaks a variety of Alemannic German.
The majority of the population (81%) identifies as Christian, about evenly split between Protestants and Catholics.

History

According to legend, the inhabitants of the Linth Valley were converted to Christianity in the 6th century by the Irish monk Saint Fridolin, the founder of Säckingen Abbey in what is now the German state of Baden-Württemberg. From the 9th century, the area around Glarus was owned by Säckingen Abbey, the town of Glarus being recorded as Clarona. The Alemanni began to settle in the valley from the early 8th century. The Alemannic German language took hold only gradually, and was dominant by the 11th century. By 1288, the Habsburgs had claimed all the abbey's rights.

Glarus joined the Old Swiss Confederacy in 1352 as one of the foundational eight cantons (Acht Orte) of the period of 1353–1481. The first recorded Landsgemeinde of Glarus took place in 1387. Habsburg attempts to reconquer the valley were repelled in the Battle of Näfels of 1388. A banner depicting Saint Fridolin was used to rally the people of Glarus at that battle, and from that time Glarus has used the image of Saint Fridolin on its flags and in its coat of arms.

The County of Werdenberg was annexed to Glarus in 1517.
Between 1506 and 1516 the later reformer Huldrych Zwingli was priest in Glarus, but Glarus remained Catholic, and by 1564 all of Zwingli's followers were eliminated. This, however, did not end the struggles between the Protestants and the Catholics in the area. To secure peace it was decided that each party should have its own assembly (Landsgemeinde) in 1623, and at a later stage in 1683, each side was granted the right to have its own tribunals.

Between 1798 and 1803 Glarus was part of the canton of Linth as established by Napoleon. In 1836 the constitution was adapted to unite the assemblies and establish a single Landsgemeinde.

In the early 1840s, after several years of failed crops and as food became scarce, much of the canton found itself deep in poverty. With more workers than available jobs, emigration to the United States of America was seen as a solution. The Glarus Emigration Society was established in 1844, which offered loans to help residents purchase land in the New World. Many of the resulting emigrants went to the state of Wisconsin, where they founded the town of New Glarus.

On May 6, 2007 Glarus became the first Swiss canton to lower the voting age to 16.

Geography

The canton of Glarus is dominated by the deep valley of the Linth River and the smaller Sernftal on the east. Most of the area is mountainous. The highest peak in the Glarus Alps is the Tödi at  Other mountains include the Hausstock and the Glärnisch. The canton contains part of a thrust fault that was declared a geologic UNESCO World Heritage Site, under the name Swiss Tectonic Arena Sardona, in 2008. Famous outcrops in the Swiss Tectonic Arena Sardona include those at Lochsite near Glarus and in a mountain cliff called Tschingelhörner between Elm and Flims (in the same cliff is a natural hole called the Martinsloch). There is also a large lake called Walensee (Lake Walen) on the north. Forestry is an important branch of industry in the canton.

Municipalities

The Landsgemeinde (cantonal assembly) of 2006 decided that the 25 municipalities of Glarus be consolidated to three, effective 1 January 2011.

 The new municipality of Glarus subsumed the former municipalities of Glarus, Ennenda, Netstal and Riedern.
 Glarus Nord subsumed Bilten, Filzbach, Mollis, Mühlehorn, Näfels, Niederurnen, Oberurnen and Obstalden.
 Glarus Süd subsumed Betschwanden, Braunwald, Elm, Engi, Haslen (including Leuggelbach and Nidfurn), Linthal, Luchsingen (including Diesbach and Hätzingen), Matt, Mitlödi, Rüti, Schwanden, Schwändi and Sool.

Demographics

, the population included 7,314 foreigners (or 19.13% of the total population).

The population is nearly evenly split between Protestants (44%) and Roman Catholics (37%).

83.6% is German-speaking and 6.8% is Italian-speaking.

Historical population 
The historical population is given in the following table:

Economy

The geography of the canton helped to establish slate works in the 17th century. The mountainous surroundings of Glarus were also an advantage in industrialisation. Cotton spinning was important in the 18th century, complementing traditional woolen spinning. Industrialisation also brought cotton printing, hydroelectric plants and later metal and machinery factories, as well as paper mills.

In 2014, about 5% of the workers in Glarus work in the primary sector (the total for all of Switzerland is 3.3%)  Of these 5%, in 2008, nearly three-quarters are involved in dairy farming and cattle breeding.  In 2014 the secondary sector employed 8,322 or about 38.2% of the total, which is much higher than 21.8% for the entire country.  Of those in the secondary sector, over one-quarter worked in the construction industry.  The tertiary sector employed 12,366 or about 56.8% of the total, which is almost 18% lower than 74.9% nationwide.  Of those in the tertiary sector, 11.72% work in retail shops and 10.37% are in health care.

Politics

Federal election results

 FDP before 2009, FDP.The Liberals after 2009
 "*" indicates that the party was not on the ballot in this canton.

See also 
 Landsgemeinde

Notes and references

External links

 Official site 
 Official statistics
 

 
Cantons of Switzerland
14th-century establishments in the Old Swiss Confederacy
1350s establishments in the Holy Roman Empire
1352 establishments in Europe